Ancaster railway station serves the village of Ancaster in Lincolnshire, England.

The station is now owned by Network Rail and managed by East Midlands Railway who provide all rail services.

It still has a working signal box at west end of the station, however is regarded as unstaffed and offers limited facilities other than two shelters, bicycle storage, timetables and modern 'Help Points'. The full range of tickets for travel are purchased from the guard on the train at no extra cost, there are no retail facilities at this station.

History
Opened by the Boston, Sleaford and Midland Counties Railway, then run by the Great Northern Railway, it became part of the London and North Eastern Railway during the Grouping of 1923. The station then passed on to the Eastern Region of British Railways on nationalisation in 1948.

When Sectorisation was introduced in the 1980s, the station was served by Regional Railways until the Privatisation of British Railways.

Services
There are no Sunday services. A Normal service operates on most Bank holidays.

References

External links

 Station on navigable O.S. map.

Railway stations in Lincolnshire
DfT Category F2 stations
Former Great Northern Railway stations
Railway stations in Great Britain opened in 1857
Railway stations served by East Midlands Railway
1857 establishments in England